Enslaved is a Norwegian extreme metal band formed by Ivar Bjørnson and Grutle Kjellson in Haugesund in June 1991. They are currently based in Bergen. The band's lineup has changed many times over the years, and Bjørnson and Kjellson have been the sole constant members. The current lineup also includes lead guitarist Arve Isdal, keyboardist/singer Håkon Vinje, and drummer Iver Sandøy.

The band's music draws heavily on the Viking cultural and religious heritage of their home country of Norway for inspiration, and most of the band's lyrics relate to Norse mythology. Though they began as a traditional black metal band their sound has undergone significant changes over time resulting in a more progressive sound. In 2014, members of Enslaved were commissioned by the Norwegian government to create a musical piece in celebration of the 200th anniversary of the Norwegian constitution. This was later released as a studio album called Skuggsjá in 2016. To date, the bands has released sixteen full-length studio albums; the most recent of which, Heimdal, was released in March 2023.

History

Formation and early history 
Enslaved was formed in July 1991 by Ivar Bjørnson and Grutle Kjellson (also known as Kjetil Grutle) when they were 13 and 17 years old, respectively. The band name was inspired by an Immortal demo track, "Enslaved in Rot." After many line-up changes throughout their career, Bjørnson and Kjellson are the only remaining original members. By 2004 the line-up solidified with guitarist Arve "Ice Dale" Isdal, drummer Cato Bekkevold, and keyboardist/vocalist Herbrand Larsen.

Prior to forming Enslaved, Bjørnson and Kjellson had been playing in a death metal band called Phobia, but like many in the burgeoning extreme metal movement, they were looking for new sources of inspiration and expression. Though Enslaved began as a prototypical Norwegian black metal band in 1991, by 1993 they were incorporating song structures unusual for the genre; several of their earlier songs reach the ten-minute mark (their debut album, Vikingligr Veldi, has only one song that is under ten minutes). As such, the band has rejected the black metal label and prefers the term "extreme metal". Mardraum (2000) contained several multi-part epics such as "Større enn tid - Tyngre enn natt" and "Entrance – Escape". Several of the band's tracks (most prominently, "As Fire Swept Clean the Earth" from Below the Lights) have used mellotron. Isa (2004) and Ruun (2006) show a marked departure from previous sounds, most notably with the inclusion of sharp dynamic shifts, and Bjørnson considers the former a turning point for the band. Following Ruun, in 2007–2008, Bjørnson, Kjellson, and Isdal collaborated with the Norwegian noise duo Fe-Mail under the name Trinacria.

International recognition 
Enslaved released the album Vertebrae in September 2008, their tenth studio album and their first on Nuclear Blast. Terrorizer Magazine named it the album of the year in 2008, notably above other metal releases such as Meshuggah's obZen and Opeth's Watershed. After touring Europe extensively, Enslaved embarked on a North American tour with the progressive death metal band Opeth in May 2009. The album is noted for its shift in its approach and its diverse sounds; Sammy O'Hagar from MetalSucks.net even says that "to call [Vertebrae] black metal would be quite a stretch" because "there's an impressive depth to [it] that surpasses the sour misanthropy so often (and rightfully) associated with the genre", and furthermore describing their sound as "heavy and surprisingly soft, focused and curious, true to their roots and longing to forget them". The album's sound has been said to be akin to Pink Floyd's sound on a few occasions, as well as other black metal releases in a similar vein.

Enslaved released their eleventh studio album, Axioma Ethica Odini, on 27 September 2010 in Europe and the following day in North America. In 2011 Enslaved released two new EPs. The first EP, entitled The Sleeping Gods, which was produced in partnership with Scion Audio/Visual, was released on 10 May 2011 and made available as a free download consisting of 5 original tracks. The second EP, entitled Thorn, was released on 27 August 2011 in partnership with Soulseller Records in fulfillment of a decade-old agreement. The Thorn EP, released on seven-inch vinyl, was strictly limited to 1,000 copies and featured a more atmospheric sound than the band is currently known for. Enslaved started their 20th anniversary tour "Circling Above and Within North America Tour Part IV" in September 2011 with Alcest and Junius in the United States and Canada. An official tribute album called Önd – A Tribute was released on Pictonian Records in July 2012. It contains twenty covers from twenty bands (including Dordeduh, Fen, Kraków, Vreid and Wodensthrone) to celebrate the two first decades of Enslaved's career.

After having signed to Nuclear Blast in Europe, too, Enslaved released their 12th studio album, RIITIIR, on 28 September 2012 in Europe and 9 October in North America. The album received positive reviews from music critics. In 2013 they contributed to the book "Think like a rockstar" Tenk som en rockestjerne, written by Ståle Økland.

Enslaved released their 13th full-length studio album, In Times, on 10 March 2015 through Nuclear Blast. The album received positive reviews from music critics, with AllMusic's Thom Jurek noting that the band are "still pushing at the boundaries of the music that inspired them back in 1991 when guitarist Ivar Bjørnson and vocalist/bassist Grutle Kjellson (13 and 17 years old at the time) first formed the band." In 2016 the band celebrated their 25th anniversary with a series of exclusive shows and merchandise designs. Their Spinning Wheel Ritual tour across Europe with Ne Obliviscaris and Oceans of Slumber will take place from late September to early November. They also announced their plans to release a new compilation album on 11 November 2016, titled The Sleeping Gods – Thorn. The album compiles rare and experimental material from 2010 to 2011 which were previously available as two separate EPs released in 2011: The Sleeping Gods and Thorn.

Recent history 
In December 2016, keyboardist Herbrand Larsen left the band amicably after 12 years. The band then recruited Håkon Vinje of Seven Impale, a Norwegian band that opened for them at a concert in Bergen. Enslaved's 14th studio album E was released on 13 October 2017. In June 2018, drummer Cato Bekkevold retired from the band amicably, and was replaced by Iver Sandøy, who had previously played in the side project Trinacria and co-produced several recent Enslaved albums. The band's 15th album Utgard was initially announced for Spring 2020, but was delayed by the COVID-19 pandemic; it was finally released in October 2020. The four-song EP Caravans to the Outer Worlds was released in October 2021; the EP was described by the band as a bridge between Utgard and their next full-length album in the future. Their sixteenth studio album Heimdal was released on March 3, 2023.

Musical style and influence 
The band's early music was rooted in traditional black metal and Viking metal, however the band moved away from this sound with 2001's Monumension and 2003's Below the Lights. It was at this point that the band was reduced to its two founding members, Bjørnson and Kjellson. They began to incorporate elements of progressive rock, jazz, and other distinct influences into their sound, and over time have continued this progression. Kjellson has named Pink Floyd, King Crimson, Rush, Genesis, Darkthrone, early Mayhem, and Bathory as important influences on the band's sound.

Members

Current
 Grutle Kjellson – lead vocals, bass, synthesizers 
 Ivar Bjørnson – rhythm guitar, synthesizers, backing vocals , lead guitar 
 Arve "Ice Dale" Isdal – lead guitar 
 Håkon Vinje – keyboards, clean vocals 
 Iver Sandøy – drums, clean vocals, keyboards 

Former
 Trym Torson – drums, percussion 
 Harald Helgeson – drums 
 Dirge Rep (Per Arild Håvarstein Husebø) – drums, percussion 
 Richard "Roy" Kronheim – lead guitar 
 Herbrand Larsen – keyboards, clean vocals, live guitar 
 Cato Bekkevold – drums, percussion 

Session
 Inge Joakim Ripdal - guitars, effects, vocals

Timeline

Discography 

Studio albums
 Vikingligr Veldi (1994)
 Frost (1994)
 Eld (1997)
 Blodhemn (1998)
 Mardraum – Beyond the Within (2000)
 Monumension (2001)
 Below the Lights (2003)
 Isa (2004)
 Ruun (2006)
 Vertebrae (2008)
 Axioma Ethica Odini (2010)
 RIITIIR (2012)
 In Times (2015)
 E (2017)
 Utgard (2020)
 Heimdal (2023)

References

External links

Official website

"On the Road to Spread the Word of Good, Old-Fashioned Evil," The New York Times, 8 November 2007 (review of Enslaved's concert in Allentown, Pennsylvania).
Interview with Grutle Kjellson
"Album Review: Enslaved RIITIIR" www.MetalMouth.Net, 8th Sept 2012

Norwegian black metal musical groups
Norwegian viking metal musical groups
Norwegian progressive metal musical groups
Relapse Records artists
Musical groups established in 1991
1991 establishments in Norway
Musical groups from Haugesund
Musical quintets
Musical groups from Hordaland
Musical groups from Bergen
Nuclear Blast artists
Metal Mind Productions artists
Spellemannprisen winners